Isariopsis clavispora is a fungal plant pathogen that causes leaf spot on grape.

References

External links
 USDA ARS Fungal Database

Mycosphaerellaceae
Fungi described in 1886
Leaf diseases
Fungal grape diseases
Taxa named by Miles Joseph Berkeley